Yampa Valley Regional Airport  is in Routt County, Colorado, United States, serving the communities of Steamboat Springs, Hayden, and Craig, Colorado. It has the only scheduled passenger flights in northwest Colorado. It is also used by larger business jets that cannot use the smaller Steamboat Springs Airport (Bob Adams Field).

The National Plan of Integrated Airport Systems for 2021–2025 called it a primary commercial service airport (more than 10,000 enplanements per year). Federal Aviation Administration records say it had 87,902 passenger boardings (enplanements) in calendar year 2019, 106,007 in 2020 and 150,142 in 2021.

Facilities

In 2018 the airport completed an expansion of the apron that added a seventh aircraft parking position; in 2020 the terminal was being expanded to add a seventh gate and expanded ticketing area. The two projects cost about $10 million. The airport has nine commercial aircraft parking spots and seven gates that can handle Boeing 757s, Boeing 737s, Airbus A320/A320neos, Bombardier CRJ200s, Bombardier CRJ700/CRJ900s, Airbus A220s, Embraer 135/145s, and Embraer 170/175/190/195 Like other Colorado airports serving ski resorts, there are no jet bridges, only open air airstairs. The private ramp can handle up to 40 private jets. In the winter months larger private jets such as the Boeing 737 cannot be parked due to lack of space and must depart after deplaning passengers.

Airport procedures
The airport has no air traffic control tower. All aircraft are on a CTAF (123.0) and/or Unicom and receive airfield advisories from Unicom during hours of commercial operations. All aircraft receive approach control services from the Denver Air Route Traffic Control Center. Gates and aircraft parking slots can be assigned by Unicom or via the airline operations radio communication channels. Jet A fuel is provided by the FBO (fixed-base operator), Atlantic Aviation. All aircraft departing runway 28 make a right or left turn to avoid the populated area of Hayden. Runway 10 has an Instrument Landing System (ILS). Snow and low ceilings during winter months cause some aircraft to divert to other airports including Denver International Airport.

Airport operations
In the year ending December 31, 2021 the airport had 15,497 aircraft operations, average 42 per day: 56% general aviation, 32% scheduled airline, 34% air taxi, and 1.4% military. Eighteen aircraft were then based at this airport: four single-engine and fourteen multi-engine.

The airport has two ARFF trucks in the operations garage that are run by full-time and seasonal firefighters. They operate ARFF index C from December to March, and ARFF index B from April to November. The ARFF trucks are staffed by firefighters when a scheduled flight is arriving or departing with more than 10 passengers. Local fire departments, like The West Routt Fire Protection District and the North Routt Fire Protection District, can respond to the airport if mutual aid is needed. Transportation can be provided by local taxi, Lyft, Uber, and three shuttle companies with staffed help desks in the baggage claim terminal.

Airlines and destinations

Historical airline service

Yampa Valley Airport was first served by the original Frontier Airlines with nonstop flights to Denver and direct flights to Salt Lake City with two stops. The service ran year round from late 1966 until early 1982 and Convair 580 turboprop aircraft were used. Rocky Mountain Airways then operated flights to Denver but used the Steamboat Springs Airport. Yampa Valley Airport began seeing seasonal ski service during the winter of 1985/1986 when Aspen Airways flew British Aerospace 146 four engine jets to Denver. During the 1986/1987 season, PSA provided flights to Los Angeles and San Francisco using McDonnell Douglas MD-80 jets. American Airlines then began regular seasonal service beginning with the 1987/1988 season and multiple other carriers followed in the years after that. During the 1990s and 2000s Yampa Valley Airport also saw service by Continental Airlines, Northwest Airlines, and TWA. During the 2000/2001 season, the second Midway Airlines (1993-2003) provided nonstop service to Raleigh/Durham, NC. Most major carriers now serve the airport on a seasonal basis while United and Southwest Airlines provide year round service.

Statistics

Top destinations

* Delta curtailed flights due to COVID-19 for most of 2021 and resumed in late 2021

Airline market share

All seasonal flights during ski season begin in December and end in April. The only year-round scheduled flights are to Denver International Airport by SkyWest flying as United Express, as well as flights to Denver International Airport and Dallas Love Field by Southwest Airlines.  Mainline jets operated by the three major airlines during ski season include the Airbus A319 and A320 as well as the Boeing 737-800, Boeing 717 and 757-200.

Accidents and incidents
At 1:56 PM on March 14, 2001, TWA flight 641, a McDonnell Douglas MD-81 from St. Louis Lambert International Airport with 122 passengers and crew, mistakenly landed at the Craig-Moffat Airport (CAG) while on approach into the Yampa Valley Airport during a snowstorm. Craig-Moffat Airport is located approximately 17 miles west of Hayden, Colorado, and its only runway, 7/25, measures 5,600 feet—nearly half that of the Yampa Valley Airport's 10,000 foot runway 10/28. Though the flight landed safely with no injuries, the aircraft did get stuck in mud while attempting a turn at the end of the runway. Passengers were eventually bussed to the Yampa Valley Airport.
 At 11:57 on January 22, 2022, JetBlue Airways flight 1748, an Airbus A320-232, suffered a tailstrike on takeoff. As the flight was rolling for takeoff on runway 10, a Beechcraft Super King Air 350 (N350J) was approaching from the opposite direction for a landing on runway 28 at the other end. ADS-B data suggest that the King Air was about 5300 m (2.86 nm) short of the threshold of runway 28 when JetBlue 1748 started rolling for takeoff on runway 10. The flight was diverted to Denver and landed safely with no further incident.

References

External links
 Yampa Valley Regional Airport
 Yampa Valley Regional Airport (HDN) at Colorado DOT airport directory
 V, the fixed-base operator (FBO)
 Aerial image as of September 1999 from USGS The National Map
 

Transportation buildings and structures in Routt County, Colorado
Airports in Colorado